Walter Eduardo Cortés Pérez (born 5 February 2000) is a Costa Rican professional footballer who plays as a defender for Saprissa.

Honours

Club
Saprissa
Liga FPD: Clausura 2020, Clausura 2021

References

2000 births
Living people
Deportivo Saprissa players
Philadelphia Union II players
Liga FPD players
USL Championship players
Costa Rican expatriate footballers
Costa Rican footballers
Association football defenders
Costa Rican expatriate sportspeople in the United States
Expatriate soccer players in the United States
Costa Rica under-20 international footballers